Regional Sports Complex "Olimpiyskyi" stadium is a multi-purpose stadium in Donetsk, Ukraine. The stadium is part of bigger sports complex Olimpiyskyi and until 2014 was property of the National Olympic Committee of Ukraine. Since 2014 along with neighboring Donbass Arena, it became a property of the Donetsk People's Republic. It has a capacity of 25,678 people. In 2014, the stadium's ownership has changed.

Built in 1958 as part of whole Lokomotyv sports complex, originally it belonged to the Soviet Lokomotiv sports society. The stadium was built for the Donets Railway main football team that since 1948 played in Artemivsk (Bakhmut).

After its reconstruction in 2003, the stadium was also host to  Shakhtar's city-rivals, FC Metalurh Donetsk. Shakhtar  became the sole tenant of the stadium from 2004, until their new Donbass Arena was completed. FC Metalurh Donetsk has moved back to their own stadium, Metalurh Stadium which is considerably smaller.

References

1958 establishments in Ukraine
FC Lokomotyv Donetsk
Football venues in Donetsk Oblast
Sports venues built in the Soviet Union
Sport in Donetsk
Multi-purpose stadiums in Ukraine
Buildings and structures in Donetsk
Sports venues in Donetsk Oblast
Serhiy Bubka College of Olympic Reserve